is a feminine Japanese given name.

Possible writings
The name Emiko can have a variety of different meanings depending on which kanji characters are used to write it. Some possible variations include:
栄美子; "prosperous, beauty, child"
恵美子; "blessing, favor, beauty, child"
絵美子; "picture, beauty, child"
英美子; "superior, beauty, child"
映海子; "shine, sea, child"
笑子; "laugh/smile, child"
愛実子; "love, fruit, child"

The name may also be written in hiragana or katakana.

People
 Emiko Davies, Australian-born cookbook author, food journalist and illustrator, of Australian–Japanese decent.
 Emiko Kado (門 恵美子, 1976-1999), Japanese professional wrestler
, Japanese long jumper
 Emiko Miyamoto (宮本 恵美子, born 1937), Japanese volleyball player
Emiko Nakano (1925–1990), American abstract expressionist artist, of American–Japanese decent.
 Emiko Odaka (小高 笑子, born 1962), former Japanese volleyball player
, Japanese table tennis player
 , American anthropologist
, Japanese alpine skier
Emiko Okuyama (奥山 恵美子, born 1951), Japanese politician
 Emiko Raika (来家 恵美子, born 1975), Japanese professional boxer
, Japanese cross-country skier
 Emiko Shinohara (篠原 恵美子, born 1963), Japanese voice actress
 Emiko Shiratori (白鳥 英美子, born 1950), Japanese singer and songwriter
 Emiko Suzuki (鈴木 絵美子, born 1981), Japanese synchronized swimmer
, Japanese speed skater
 Emiko Uematsu (植松 恵美子, born 1967), Japanese politician
 Emiko Ueno (植野恵美子, born 1957), Japanese badminton player
, Japanese handball player

Fictional characters
 Emiko Niwa (丹羽 笑子), a character in the manga series D.N.Angel
 Emiko Yamane (山根 恵美子), a character in the 1954 film Godzilla
 Emiko, a main character in the science fiction novel The Windup Girl
 Emiko Queen, a character from DC Comics

See also
 Eiko
 Emi
 Emiri

Japanese feminine given names